The Pro Hokei Ligasy formerly known as Republic of Kazakhstan Open Ice Hockey Championship, commonly referred to as Kazakh Hockey Championship, is an annual ice hockey award and national title, bestowed to the winning ice hockey team in Kazakhstan, founded in 1992.

On August 9, 2015, a 12,000-seat and 86,000-square-metre Ice Palace was opened in the Kazakh capital of Astana. The complex includes an ice arena, an ice hockey academy and 50-metre Olympic and artistic swimming pools.

Teams

Current teams

Former teams 
 Avtomobilist Karagandy
 Arystan Temirtau
 Barys Astana
 Bulat Temirtau
 Kazakhmys Satpaev
 Magnitka Temirtau
 Yenbek Almaty
 Yesil Petropavlovsk
 HK Astana

Champions

All-time standings

See also 
 Kazakhstan Hockey Cup

References

External links 
 Kazakhstan Ice Hockey Federation
 English language forum for the Kazakhstan Hockey Championship
 Eliteprospects

 
Top tier ice hockey leagues
1
Kazakhstan
Sports leagues in Kazakhstan